Low-cost housing may refer to:

Affordable housing
Subsidized housing
Low cost housing in Pakistan